Walter Frederick Schulz (April 18, 1900 – February 27, 1928) was a Major League Baseball pitcher who played for the St. Louis Cardinals in , the same year that Rogers Hornsby won the first of his seven batting titles.

Schulz worked as a salesman when he moved to Arizona because of pulmonary tuberculosis. He died at Mercy Hospital in Prescott, eight years after his only season in the major leagues. Schulz was buried at Sunset Memorial Park in Affton, Missouri, alongside his mother, Minnie Kreutzinger, who had worked in St. Louis as a nurse.

References

External links

1900 births
1928 deaths
Major League Baseball pitchers
Baseball players from St. Louis
St. Louis Cardinals players
20th-century deaths from tuberculosis
Tuberculosis deaths in Arizona